The following is a timeline of the history of the city of Boise, Idaho, United States.

19th century
 Pre-colonization - Area inhabited by Boise Valley Shoshone and Bannock Tribes, a part of the "Snake Country"
 1811 – Wilson Hunt's expedition in search of Fur trade routes becomes the first White American settler to visit the area
 1818 – "Joint-Occupation" of the region by the United Kingdom and the United States, in practice the region remained free of Settler incursions and HBC had a monopoly
 1846 – British relinquishing of its claim, US takeover and establishment of "Oregon Territory. 
 1848 – Passage of Donation Land Claim Act Increasing settler incursion en route to the Pacific Coast of Oregon
 1854 – Ward Massacre, the killing of 21 settlers in an attack on a 6-wagon caravan.
 1863 – Gold mines discovered in the area. Fort Boise established by United States Army.
 1864 – October 10: Governor of the territory and Boise Valley Shoshone tribe sign a treaty in which the tribe gives up the control of the land upon which Boise is located. Treaty was never ratified by Congress.
 1864 –   Idaho Tri-Weekly Statesman newspaper begins publication.

 1864 –  December 7: Boise designated capital of Idaho Territory.
 1866 – Christ Chapel built.
 1866 – (Lasted until 1868) Start of the unofficial Snake War between settler residents and the US Military on one side, and indigenous peoples of Boise Valley on the other. Statistically, the deadliest of the Indian Wars in the West in terms of casualties.
 1867 – Henry E. Prickett becomes mayor.
 1869 – "Idaho's Trail of Tears", forced expulsion of Boise Valley Shoshone and Bannock Tribes to Fort Hall Reservation
 1870 – Territorial Prison built.
 1871 – Assay Office (Boise, Idaho) built.
 1881 – Historical Society of Idaho Pioneers organized.
 1882 - Boise High School first opened.
 1886 - Anti-Chinese convention held 
 1890
 Boise becomes capital of new State of Idaho.
 Population: 2,311.
 1892 – Woman's Columbian Club organized.
 Boise Sentinel newspaper begins publication.
 1896 – Ahavath Beth Israel synagogue built.
 1897 – Idaho Intermountain Fair begins.

20th century

 1900 – Population: 5,957.
 1901 – Idanha Hotel opens
 1902 - Boise High School building replaced. "Not the well-known white brick building present today, but traditional red brick, typical of the time period. The cornerstone was laid in 1902." 
 1905 – Carnegie Public Library opens 
 1906 – Boise Commercial Club organized 

 1907 – Julia Davis Park established
 1908 – Pinney Theatre opens 
 Swedish Lutheran Church built
 1909 – College Women's Club organized 
 1910 – YWCA organized 
 Population: 17,358.
 1912 – Idaho State Capitol opens (first phase)
 1913 – Idaho Labor Herald and New Freedom newspapers begin publication.
 Boise-Payette Lumber Company in business

 1920 – Population: 21,393
 1921 – St. John's Cathedral completed
 1925 – Union Pacific Depot opens
 Idaho Country Club founded, became Hillcrest in 1940
 1926 – Airfield in operation, at present site of Boise State University
 1927 – Egyptian Theatre opens
 1928 – Bandshell built in Julia Davis Park
 1930 -  Idaho's First Skyscraper Hotel Boise completed. (Named Hoff Building in 1976.)
 1932 – Boise Junior College opens
 Idaho Legionnaire newspaper begins publication
 1938 – Boise Airport moves to present site 
 1939 – Rose Garden dedicated in Julia Davis Park
 First Albertsons supermarket opens
 1940 – Hillcrest Country Club opens at former Idaho Country Club
 State Funeral of U.S. Senator William Borah; 23,000 pass bier in state capitol

 1955 – Boise homosexuality scandal begins
 1957 – Boise Cascade headquartered in Boise
 1958 – Second public high school, Borah, opens
 1960 – Population: 34,481
 1964 – Bishop Kelly High School opens
 1965 – Third public high school, Capital, opens
 1968 – Boise Greenbelt plan adopted
 1969 – Boise College becomes Boise State College
 1970 – New Bronco Stadium opens, constructed in less than a year.
 Population: 74,990
 1971 - The Boise Redevelopment Agency purchased and demolished the remaining core of Boise's Chinatown.
 1972 – St. Alphonsus Hospital moves to present site from downtown
 1973 – Boise Co-op founded.
 State Penitentiary closes
 1974 – Boise State College becomes Boise State University and Boise Bible College established.
 1975 – One Capital Center opens
 Boise A's minor league baseball team begins play (two seasons)
 1976 – Old St. Alphonsus Hospital arson, later razed.
 1977 – Idaho Shakespeare Festival begins.

 1978 – U.S. Bank Plaza opens, as "Idaho First Plaza"
 Micron Technology begins operations
 Boise Buckskins minor league baseball team begins play (sole season)
 1979 – Mountain West Airlines-Idaho headquartered in Boise
 1980 – Population: 102,249
 1982 – Taco Bell Arena opens as "BSU Pavilion"
 1984 – World Center for Birds of Prey established
 Boise, Idaho Temple of The Church of Jesus Christ of Latter-day Saints opens
 Funeral of U.S. Senator Frank Church
 1986 – Bronco Stadium installs first blue AstroTurf field
 1987 – Boise Hawks minor league baseball team's first season, relocated from Tri-Cities
 Eastman Building fire,
 1988 – Boise Towne Square Mall opens
 Discovery Center of Idaho constructed.
 1989 – Memorial Stadium opens for baseball
 1990 – Boise Open golf tournament begins
 Boise Centre (convention center) opens
 Population: 125,738
 1992 – Boise Weekly begins publication
 Foothills School of Arts and Sciences established
 1995 – Idaho Black History Museum built 
 1997
 City website online (approximate date).
 Boise Contemporary Theater group founded
 CenturyLink Arena opens
 Famous Idaho Potato Bowl (college football) game begins as "Humanitarian Bowl"
 Removal of passenger services at Boise Union Pacific Depot
 1998 – Fourth public high school, Timberline, opens
 1999 – Boise Hare Krishna Temple built

21st century

 2000 – Riverstone Community School relocates to Boise.
 Population: 181,711 
 2002 – Islamic Center founded.
 2003 – Boise Dharma Center founded.
 2004 – David H. Bieter becomes mayor.
 2005 – Caldwell-Boise Express bus begins operating.
 Boise Guardian begins publication.
 2006 – Treasure Valley Rollergirls founded.
 Albertsons LLC headquartered in Boise.

 2007 – College of Western Idaho founded.
 2008 – Trey McIntyre dance troupe relocates to Boise.
 Frank Church High School opens.
 2009 – February: 2009 Special Olympics World Winter Games held.
 2010 – Population: 205,671.
 2011 – Idaho Aquarium opens.
 2012 – Treefort Music Fest begins.
 2013 – City sesquicentennial.
 2017 – June 8, Declaration of the annual "Return of the Boise Valley People Day" to commemorate the connection of the exiled Boise Valley Shoshone and Bannock Tribes to their ancestral land

See also
 Boise history
 Boise metropolitan area
 Media in Boise, Idaho
 List of mayors of Boise

References

Bibliography

External links

 Boise City Office of the Historian
 Items related to Boise, various dates (via Digital Public Library of America).
 Items related to Boise, various dates (via U.S. Library of Congress, Prints and Photos Division)

Boise, Idaho
 
Boise
boise